Francis Curry McHugh (May 23, 1898 – September 11, 1981) was an American stage, radio, film and television actor.

Early years
Born in Homestead, Pennsylvania, of Irish descent, McHugh came from a theatrical family. His parents, Edward A. "Cutie" McHugh and Katherine Curry "Katie" McHugh, ran the McHugh stock theater company in Braddock, Pennsylvania. As a young child he performed on stage. His brother Matt and sister Kitty performed in an act with him by the time he was 10 years old, but the family quit the stage around 1930. Another brother, Ed, became a stage manager and agent in New York.

Career
Leaving the family stage company at age 17, McHugh went to Pittsburgh as leading man and stage manager at the Empire Theater there. He spent nine years in stock companies and road troupes before appearing on Broadway.

McHugh debuted on Broadway in The Fall Guy, written by George Abbott and James Gleason in 1925. He also appeared in Show Girl (1929), a musical. In that same year, he made his first film, If Men Played Cards as Women Do, a short produced by Paramount. First National Pictures hired him as a contract player in January 1930.

McHugh played everything from leading man to sidekick. He often provided comic relief, particularly as genial—or obnoxious— inebriates. A wheezy, drawn-out mocking laugh, accompanied by a waving, admonitory finger, was his trademark. He appeared in more than 150 films and television productions and worked with almost every star at Warner Bros. A close friend of James Cagney, he appeared in more Cagney movies than any other actor—eleven films between 1932 and 1953. Their friendship lasted until McHugh's death.

Cast as Father Timothy O'Dowd in the 1944 Bing Crosby film, Going My Way, McHugh later played William Jennings Depew in the 1962 episode "Keep an Eye on Santa Claus" in the ABC television series, Going My Way, starring Gene Kelly, and loosely based on the earlier film.

From 1954 to 1956, he starred in the radio program Hotel For Pets.
By the 1950s, his film career had begun to decline, as evinced by his smaller role in the 1959 film Career.

From 1964 to 1965, he played Willie Walters, a live-in handyman in the 27-episode ABC sitcom The Bing Crosby Show, which reunited him once again onscreen with Bing Crosby. The show also co-starred Beverly Garland. McHugh's last feature film role was as a comical "sea captain" in the 1967 Elvis Presley caper film Easy Come, Easy Go. McHugh's last television appearance was as handyman Charlie Wingate in "The Fix-It Man", an episode of CBS's Lancer Western series, which starred Andrew Duggan.

On radio, McHugh had the role of Fairchild Finnegan in Phone Again, Finnegan (1946-1947).  He also co-starred in Hotel for Pets (1954-1956).

McHugh belonged to a group of friends, known in Hollywood as the “Irish Mafia,” that included his close friends James Cagney, Pat O’Brien and Spencer Tracy, as well as fellow actors Allen Jenkins, Ralph Bellamy, Lynne Overman and Frank Morgan.

World War II
During World War II, McHugh joined the Hollywood Victory Caravan, a group that included 21 stars traveling around the country on a special train, performing in several cities over the course of three weeks in 1942 to raise money for the Army and Navy Relief Society. He followed that with a USO tour of England, appearing in the American Variety Show with Al Jolson, Merle Oberon, Patricia Morison and Allen Jenkins.

McHugh returned to Europe with a USO show created by him, “McHugh’s Revue,” which toured France, Holland, Belgium and Germany in November and December of 1944. McHugh, four beautiful girls (actresses Mary Brian, June Clyde, Charlotte Greer and Nina Nova) and piano-player Eddie Eisman toured the front line, entertaining and meeting the troops. The McHugh Papers at the New York Public Library include many accounts of the tour. For his work with the USO, McHugh received a citation “for exceptionally meritorious service while working as a member of an entertainment unit” from the U.S. Army, signed by Major General Raymond S. McLain. In a 1945 letter to McHugh and his troupe, McLain wrote:“I want to make of record what I was glad to say to each of you when you left and what many of the command said to you then and what they have said to me since — “That your show was like an oasis in this desert of hardship and suffering”. It reminded us what a vital factor a bit of entertainment is in this business where boredom is almost as difficult to bear as the hardships of the campaign. Your show was sparkling, and left a refreshing atmosphere in the spirit of many battle weary soldiers.”Personal life and death

McHugh was married to Dorothy Spencer from 1933 until his death. They had three children and two grandchildren. His brother Matt McHugh and sister Kitty McHugh were also actors who both appeared in many films.

On September 11, 1981, McHugh died in Greenwich Hospital in Greenwich, Connecticut at age 83.

Filmography

Short subjects as himself:An Intimate Dinner in Celebration of Warner Bros. Silver Jubilee (1930)Hollywood Newsreel (1934) (uncredited)A Dream Comes True (1935)Screen Snapshots Series 15, No. 3 (1935)Screen Snapshots Series 16, No. 1 (1936)A Day at Santa Anita (1937)Sunday Night at the Trocadero (1937)Breakdowns of 1938'' (1938)

Notes

External links

 
 
 New York Public Library blog on Frank McHugh
 
 
 
 Frank McHugh and Family papers, 1894-1969, held by the Billy Rose Theatre Division, New York Public Library for the Performing Arts
 Literature on Frank McHugh

1898 births
1981 deaths
Male actors from Pennsylvania
American male film actors
American male television actors
American male stage actors
American male radio actors
American people of Irish descent
People from Homestead, Pennsylvania
Warner Bros. contract players
20th-century American male actors
Male actors from Los Angeles
Male actors from Greenwich, Connecticut